The Men's 100 metres at the 2010 Commonwealth Games as part of the athletics programme was held at the Jawaharlal Nehru Stadium on Wednesday 6 October and Thursday 7 October 2010.

The top three runners in each of the initial eight heats automatically qualified for the second round. The next eight fastest runners from across the heats also qualified. Those 32 runners competed in 4 heats in the second round, with the top four runners from each heat qualifying for the semifinals. There were two semifinals, and only the top three from each heat advanced to the final and the two fastest runners.

Records

Round 1

Heat 1

Heat 2

Heat 3

Heat 4

Heat 5

Heat 6

Heat 7

Heat 8

Round 2

Heat 1

Heat 2

Heat 3

Heat 4

Semifinals

Semifinal 1

Semifinal 2

Final

External links
2010 Commonwealth Games - Athletics

Men's 100 metres
2010